Argentina, tierra de amor y venganza (Argentina, Land of Love and Revenge, sometimes shortened as "ATAV") is an Argentine telenovela produced by Pol-ka Producciones that premiered on 11 March 2019 on El Trece. It is written by Leandro Calderone and Carolina Aguirre and directed by Sebastián Pivotto and Martín Sabán. It stars María Eugenia Suárez, Benjamín Vicuña, Gonzalo Heredia, Albert Baró, Delfina Chaves, Fernán Mirás, Andrea Frigerio and Virginia Innocenti. The telenovela is set in Argentina in the 1930s, in times of prosperity and progress as well as the wave of mainly European immigration in Argentina and political and economic decline.

On 5 March 2020, Adrián Suar confirmed that the series had been renewed for a second season, which was originally scheduled to premiere in 2021.

Plot
Torcuato Ferreyra is a veteran of the Spanish Civil War who managed to amass a great fortune in Argentina after betraying his best friend, Bruno Salvat. At the end of the 30s, Bruno arrives in Argentina, in order to avenge Torcuato's treachery and rescue his sister Julia, who fell into the clutches of a pimp. Bruno gets asylum in a typical conventillo in Buenos Aires and from there he begins to plot his revenge plan.

However, while plotting his plan, Bruno falls madly in love with Lucía Morel, the young and beautiful fiancée of Torcuato Ferreyra. Lucía is an intelligent, feminist and sensitive young woman who only agrees to marry Torcuato at the insistence of her vile mother to get money for the operation of her father, who is sick with tuberculosis. Meanwhile, Aldo, a good-hearted hustler who is dedicated to convincing Spanish immigrants to embark towards Argentina under the pretext of being the land of opportunities, will do his best to rescue a young and beautiful Polish girl, Raquel, from the brothel where Julia is.

Other subplots of the telenovela include the romance between two young boys, Nino and Malek, the repressed homosexuality of Lucia's mother and the unrequited love of Alicia, Torcuato's sister, for Aldo.

Cast

Main 
 Benjamín Vicuña as Torcuato Ferreyra
 Gonzalo Heredia as Aldo Moretti
 María Eugenia Suárez as Raquel Liberman
 Albert Baró as Bruno Salvat
 Delfina Chaves as Lucía Morel
 Fernán Mirás as Samuel Trauman
 Andrea Frigerio as Madama Ivonne
 Virginia Innocenti as Libertad Morel

Recurring 
 Mercedes Funes as Alicia Ferreyra
 Julia Calvo as Serafina
 Malena Sánchez as Francesca Moretti
 Candela Vetrano as Anna Moretti
 Diego Domínguez as Córdoba
 Ruggero Pasquarelli as Toro
 Matías Mayer as Gallo
 Federico Salles as Gabriel Morel
 Gastón Cocchiarale as Lowenstein
 Minerva Casero as Lidia Morel
 Tomás Kirzner as Julián
 Ana Pauls as Edith
 Fausto Bengoechea as Alambre
 Franco Quercia as Malek
 Ariel Pérez de María as Alí Moretti
 Joaquín Flamini as Nino
 Juan Manuel Correa
 Laura Minguell

Production
Production of the soap opera began on January 2, 2019 and ended on November 15, 2019. After "Padre Coraje", the telenovela is one of the most expensive productions of El Trece in recent years. A large part of the production takes place in the Baires Studios of Don Torcuato, for each episode filmed, 150 people were needed. The character of María Eugenia Suárez is based on the life of Rokhl Lea Liberman (better known as Raquel Liberman), a Polish woman born in the 20th century, who, like the character, suffered from abuse in Argentina. Unlike the soap opera, Ruchla Laja Liberman had 2 children and the character only has 4 siblings. Furthermore, the character of Fernán Mirás is based on Noé Trauman, the first president of the trafficking network Zwi Migdal.

Sequel
In 2021, the sequel to Argentina, tierra de amor y venganza was confirmed, which would be set in 1962. However, in 2022, due to the non-continuation of a large part of the original cast, it was announced that it will be set 50 years later in 1980. In March 2022, it was confirmed that the main cast would be made up of Gloria Carrá, Federico D'Elía, Juan Gil Navarro, Virginia Lago, Susana Giménez, Moria Casán, Justina Bustos, Ignacio Di Marco, Malena Solda, Santiago Talledo, Belén Chavanne, Toni Gelabert, Renato Quattordio, Federico Amador, Andrea Rincón, and the special participation of Darío Barassi. Filming is scheduled to start on May 9, 2022.

Airing
The first season aired during 2019, from March 11 to December 30.

Separadas replaced it at the prime time in 2020, but it was cancelled amid the COVID-19 pandemic in Argentina. El Trece replaced it with reruns, and aired the first season of Argentina... again on June 22. It performed poorly against Telefe, that aired the Brazilian telenovela Jesus and a rerun of Educando a Nina.

Television rating

References 

2019 telenovelas
2019 Argentine television series debuts
2019 Argentine television series endings
Argentine telenovelas
El Trece original programming
Great Depression television series
Jews and Judaism in fiction
Pol-ka telenovelas
Spanish-language telenovelas
Works about sex trafficking
2010s Argentine drama television series
Spanish-language television shows
Television series about immigration